Allar, Azerbaijan may refer to:
Allar, Jalilabad
Allar, Yardymli